Mathilda Wrede (March 8, 1864, Vaasa – December 25, 1928), was a Finnish evangelist and baroness, known for being a precursor in the rehabilitation of prisoners, and known in Finland as "Friend of the prisoners".

Life

Her father, Carl Gustaf Fabian Wrede, was the provincial governor of the Vaasa province. It was during this time she first came in contact with inmates, that were sent to the governors house to make repairs.

At the age of 19 she experienced a religious revival and started to work for those less fortunate. She felt that the curing of inmates souls was her calling. She visited prisons, discussed religious issues, arranged occasions to hold speeches and discuss the Bible, distributed religious literature and was in direct correspondence with many of the inmates. This exceeded many of the social rules that was thought to be appropriate for a young woman of her stature. Matilda Wrede worked alone and in a way that differed a lot from the charity work done by other women in a position like hers.

In 1886 she founded Toivola, a farm for unemployed, newly released prisoners to work at. Henrik Wrede, her brother had earlier spent three years in Siberia, evangelizing the local people and Finnish criminals deported there.

Because of her social position she managed to get support for her work among Europe's nobility.

References
Mathilda Wrede

1864 births
1928 deaths
People from Vaasa
Finnish Protestant missionaries
Female Christian missionaries
Swedish-speaking Finns
Finnish people of German descent
19th-century Finnish people
Protestant missionaries in Finland
Finnish philanthropists